"Silver Bells" is a Christmas song composed by Jay Livingston and Ray Evans.

The song is started by William Frawley, and then sung in the generally known version immediately thereafter by Bob Hope and Marilyn Maxwell in the motion picture The Lemon Drop Kid, which was filmed in July and August 1950 and released in March 1951. The first recorded version was sung by Bing Crosby and Carol Richards on September 8, 1950, with John Scott Trotter and His Orchestra and the Lee Gordon Singers. The recording was released by Decca Records in October 1950. After the Crosby/Richards recording became popular, Hope and Maxwell were called back in late 1950 to reshoot a more elaborate production of the song.

History 

"Silver Bells" started out as "Tinkle Bells". Songwriter Ray Evans said: "We never thought that tinkle had a double meaning until Jay went home and his first wife said, 'Are you out of your mind? Do you know what the word tinkle is?'" The word is slang for urination.

This song's inspiration is the source of conflicting reports. Several periodicals and interviews cite writer Jay Livingston stating that the song's inspiration came from the bells used by sidewalk Santa Clauses and Salvation Army solicitors on New York City street corners. However, in an interview with NPR, co-writer Ray Evans said that the song was inspired by a bell that sat on an office desk that he shared with Livingston.

Kate Smith's 1966 version of "Silver Bells" became popular and has since been featured prominently in film and on holiday albums. The song was recorded by American country duo the Judds and was released as a single in 1987, charting for one week in 1998 at No. 68 on the Hot Country Songs chart. In 2009 the song charted in the United Kingdom for the first time when a duet by Terry Wogan and Aled Jones that had been recorded for charity reached the Top 40, peaking at No. 27.

See also
 List of Christmas carols

References

External links 

 What's in a song? 'Silver Bells' — NPR interviews the author Ray Evans, with audio.

1950 songs
American Christmas songs
Bing Crosby songs
Songs written for films
Songs with music by Jay Livingston
Songs with lyrics by Ray Evans
Lotta Engberg songs
Jill Johnson songs
The Judds songs
Bob Dylan songs
Songs about Santa Claus
Songs about children
Songs about weather